There's a Trumpet in My Soul is an album by avant-garde jazz saxophonist Archie Shepp released in 1975 on the Arista Freedom label.

Reception
The Allmusic review by Scott Yanow states: "Two vocals and a poem recitation weigh down the music a bit, although Shepp gets in some good licks. The overall results are not essential, but Archie Shepp was still in his musical prime at the time."

Track listing 
 "There's a Trumpet in My Soul Suite Part 1: There's a Trumpet in My Soul/Samba da Rua/Zaid, Part 1" (Semenya McCord, Archie Shepp, Charles Greenlee) - 10:29
 "Down in Brazil" (Roy Burrowes, Beaver Harris) - 10:06
 "There's a Trumpet in My Soul Suite Part 2: Zaid, Part 2/It Is the Year of the Rabbit/Zaid, Part 3" (Greenlee, Shepp, Greenlee; poem: Bill Hasson) - 17:45
Recorded in NYC, April 12, 1975

Personnel 
 Archie Shepp - tenor and soprano saxophone
 Roy Burrowes, Alden Griggs - trumpet, flugelhorn
 Charles Majid Greenlee - trombone
 Ray Draper - tuba
 Dave Burrell - piano
 Walter Davis Jr. - electric piano
 Brandon Ross - guitar
 Jimmy Garrison, Vishnu Bill Wood - bass
 Beaver Harris - drums
 Abdul Zahir Batin, Nene DeFense - percussion
 Bill Hasson - recitation
 Semenya McCord, Bill Willingham - vocals

References

Freedom Records albums
Archie Shepp albums
1975 albums
Albums produced by Michael Cuscuna